McConaughy is a surname. Notable people with the surname include:

David McConaughy (1823–1902), attorney, cemetery president, and civic leader in Gettysburg, Pennsylvania, USA
David McConaughy (college president) (1775–1852), the fourth president of Washington College from 1831 to 1852
James L. McConaughy (1887–1948), American politician and a former Governor of Connecticut, USA
Julia E. McConaughy (1834–1885), American litterateur and author
Walter P. McConaughy (1908–2000), career American diplomat

See also
Lake McConaughy, reservoir, 9 miles north of Ogallala, Nebraska, United States
Matthew McConaughey (born 1969), American actor, director, producer and writer
McConnaughay
McConnaughey